Events from the year 1452 in Ireland.

Incumbent
Lord: Henry VI

Events

Births

Deaths
James Butler, 4th Earl of Ormonde (b. 1392)

 
1450s in Ireland
Ireland
Years of the 15th century in Ireland